Neo-Andean is a contemporary architectural movement primarily situated in El Alto, Bolivia, expressed in the city's many cholets, or mini-mansions, and dancehalls. Bolivian architect Freddy Mamani has been described as "the best-known architect" of neo-Andean architecture. Mamani is "a civil engineer who began as a simple laborer two decades ago" and has built over 60 neo-Andean structures in El Alto since 2005.

Architecture historian Elisabetta Andreoli described the style, represented in over 100 structures across the El Alto skyline, as neo-Andean. Paola Flores noted that "most [of the neo-Andean structures] have been built since President Evo Morales, an Aymara who is the country's first indigenous leader, took office in 2006. Their emergence coincides with a modest economic boom coupled with a rise in Aymara pride."

The term was first used in an architectural journal to reference the style of the United States Embassy building in Lima, Peru by Arquitectonica in 1996, described as having "quite literally took inspiration from Peruvian history, modelling the base of the building on the structures of the ancient cities of Cuzco and Machu Picchu."

Reception 
Neo-Andean architecture has generally been received with praise from residents in El Alto. Paola Flores notes that Alteños, or residents of El Alto, "are generally pleased with their contribution to modern architecture," noting of a resident who stated "'To me, it's like a shout that says, 'Here we are! This is what we are!'" and another who remarked "'I am an Aymara woman, proud of my culture, happy and full of color. So why should my home not show what I am?'" The buildings were featured in Shine Heroes by Frederico Estol, a film covering the thousands of shoeshiners of La Paz and El Alto. 

The buildings have been described as "futuristic" and "funky" by outsiders to Andean culture. In particular, several have drawn comparisons to legendary comic-book artist Jack Kirby, with many coming to the conclusion that Kirby–also influenced by South American architecture and patterns–and Mamani draw from the same influences.

Gallery

References 

Architectural styles
21st-century architectural styles
Architecture in Bolivia
Indigenous architecture of the Americas